The Royal Norwegian Order of Saint Olav (or Sanct Olafs Orden, the old Norwegian name) is a Norwegian order of chivalry instituted by King Oscar I on 21 August 1847. It is named after King Olav II, known to posterity as St. Olav.

Just before the union with Sweden was dissolved in 1905, the Order of the Norwegian Lion was instituted in 1904 by King Oscar II, but no appointments were awarded by his successor, King Haakon VII. The Order of St. Olav thus became the kingdom's only order of chivalry for the next 80 years. The Grand Master of the order is the reigning monarch of Norway. It is used to reward individuals for remarkable accomplishments on behalf of the country and humanity. Since 1985, appointments to the order has only been conferred upon Norwegian citizens, though foreign heads of state and royalty may be appointed as a matter of courtesy.

Grades and classes
The reigning monarch of Norway is the order's Grand Master. The order consists of three grades, of which two are divided into two classes, and may be awarded for either civilian or military contributions, in descending order of distinction. The collar is awarded as a separate distinction of the Grand Cross to those recipients deemed exceptionally worthy.

 Grand Cross (Storkors)  awarded to heads of state as a courtesy and in rare cases to individuals for merit; wears the badge on a collar (chain), plus the star on the left chest. If the collar is not worn the badge may be worn on a sash on the right shoulder;
 Commander, which is divided into two classes:
 Commander with Star (Kommandør med stjerne)  wears the badge on a necklet, plus the star on the left chest;
 Commander (Kommandør)  wears the badge on a necklet;
 Knight, which is divided into two classes:
 Knight 1st Class (Ridder av 1. klasse)  wears the badge on a ribbon on the left chest;
 Knight (Ridder)  wears the badge on a ribbon on the left chest.

Insignia

The collar of the Order is in gold, with five enamelled and crowned monograms "O", five enamelled and crowned coat-of-arms of Norway, and 10 gold crosses bottony each flanked by two battle axes with silver blades and golden shafts (The latter element is also featured in the coat of arms of the Church of Norway).

The badge of the Order is a white enamelled Maltese Cross, in silver for the knight class and in gilt of the higher classes; crowned monograms "O" appear between the arms of the cross. The obverse central disc is red with the golden Norwegian lion rampart bearing a battle-axe; the reverse disc bears the King Oscar's motto «Ret og Sandhed»  "Justice and Truth" in Norwegian; both discs are surrounded by a white-blue-white ring. The cross is topped by a crown; military awards have crossed swords between the crown and the cross.

The star of the Order for the Grand Cross is an eight-pointed silver star with faceted rays, bearing the obverse of the badge of the Order (minus the crown on the top).

The star for Commander with Star is a silver faceted Maltese Cross, with gilt crowned monograms "O" between the arms of the cross. The central disc is red with the golden Norwegian lion rampart bearing a battle axe, surrounded by a white-blue-white ring.

The ribbon of the Order is red with white-blue-white edge stripes.

In very exceptional circumstances the Order may be awarded "with diamonds", in which case a ring of diamonds replaces the white-blue-white enamel ring surrounding the central disc on the front of the badge as well as in the crown. 

The insignia are expected to be returned either upon the receiver's advancement to a higher level of the order or upon his or her death. The insignia are produced in Norway by craftsmen.

Eligibility and appointment

The King makes appointments upon the recommendation of a six-member commission, none of whom may be a member of the government, consisting of a chancellor, vice chancellor, the Lord Chamberlain (acting as treasurer), and three other representatives. The Lord Chamberlain nominates the members of the commission, and the monarch approves them. Nominations to the order are directed at the commission through the county governor.

Princes and Princesses with succession rights to the throne are appointed to the highest degree upon reaching their age of majority.

Ranking

The Order of St. Olav is the highest civilian honour currently conferred by Norway and only ranks after the military War Cross among all Norwegian decorations still awarded in the general ranking.

In the order of precedence used at the royal court of Norway, bearers of the Royal Norwegian Order of St. Olav with collar are ranked 15th in the order of precedence, directly after the Mistress of the Robes and generals and directly before recipients of the War Cross with Sword. Bearers of the Grand Cross of the Royal Norwegian Order of St. Olav are ranked 16th.

Current holders of the Grand Cross
This list contains holders of the Grand Cross, some of whom have also been awarded the Collar and gives the year of their appointment. The list is collated alphabetically by the last name; those recipients not possessing the last name, such as royalty and most Icelanders are collated by the first name. Six of the listed are not heads of states or royals; these are marked by names in bold. Before the Royal Norwegian Order of Merit was created in 1985, appointments to the Order of St Olav was awarded to members of a foreign delegation during state visits. Many holders of the Grand Cross who are not heads of state are not listed here.

See also
 Orders, decorations, and medals of Norway
 St. Olav's Medal

References

Works cited

External links

 The Order of St. Olav Website of the Royal Court 
 Statues of the Order of St. Olav (in Norwegian) Website of the Royal Court 

 
Awards established in 1847
1847 establishments in Norway